Richard Olmsted (February 20, 1612 – April 20, 1687) was a founding settler of both Hartford and Norwalk, Connecticut. He served in the General Court of the Connecticut Colony in the sessions of May 1653, October 1654, May 1658, October 1660, May 1662, May and October 1663, May and October 1664, October 1665, May and October 1666, May 1667, May and October 1668, May 1669, May 1671, and May 1679.

Early life 
Olmsted was born in Harwich, England in 1612. It has long been claimed that he came to Boston along with his uncle James Olmsted aboard the ship Lion in 1632, but there is no evidence to support this and he probably came somewhat later. He lived in Mount Wollaston, Massachusetts Bay Colony (now Quincy) originally.
Richard Olmstead is in the passenger list of the Lyon which sailed from Thames England June 22, 1632 and arrived at Boston, Massachusetts Bay Colony in America September 16, 1632. He came with his Uncle James and his wife Joyce Cornish Olmstead, their children Nicholas, Nehemiah, and Richard's siblings John and Rebecca.

Settlement of Hartford 
In 1636, he moved to Hartford, Connecticut with the congregation of Thomas Hooker, becoming one of its original settlers.

In 1637, he was a soldier in the Pequot War.

About 1647, he married but the name of his first wife is unknown. In about 1670, he married (2) Magdelan (maiden name unknown) Smith, widow of William Smith.

In 1646, he was a constable, and in 1649 he was a fence viewer.

Settlement of Norwalk 
Roger Ludlow purchased the land that would become Norwalk in 1640. Ludlow contracted with fourteen men for the original planting of Norwalk. In 1649, Olmsted, along with Nathaniel Ely became the first two settlers.

In 1653, he was Deputy of Norwalk to the General Court at Hartford.

In 1656, appointed by the General Court, Leather seller, for Norwalk.

In 1657, he was chosen Townsman in Norwalk.

On May 19, 1659, he was appointed with three others to settle a land dispute between the towns of Stratford and Fairfield, with the Indians.
On May 17, 1660, he was appointed Grand Juror for Norwalk.

In 1661, he along with John Banks and Joseph Judson were appointed by the General Court to survey the town boundary between Fairfield and Stratford.

From 1676 to 1676, he served in King Philip's War.

On October 4, 1660, he was appointed Deputy to the General Court at Hartford.

From 1669 to 1675, he was a Selectman in Norwalk.

He was chosen Deputy of Norwalk to the General Court a dozen times between 1660 and 1679.

In 1675, at a meeting of the Council he was appointed to sign bills for the payment of soldiers in King Philip's War.

He was Commissioner for Norwalk, with magisterial powers, from 1668 to 1677.

He is listed on the Founders Stone bearing the names of the founders of Hartford in the Ancient Burying Ground in Hartford, and he is also listed on the Founders Stone bearing the names of the founders of Norwalk in the East Norwalk Historical Cemetery.

References 

1612 births
1687 deaths
American Puritans
Burials in East Norwalk Historical Cemetery
Deputies of the Connecticut General Court (1639–1662)
Deputies of the Connecticut General Assembly (1662–1698)
Founders of Hartford, Connecticut
People from Harwich
Founding settlers of Norwalk, Connecticut
Pequot War
King Philip's War